Teodoro Salah (13 May 1917 – 19 February 1995) was a Chilean water polo player. He competed in the men's tournament at the 1948 Summer Olympics.

References

External links
 

1917 births
1995 deaths
Chilean male water polo players
Olympic water polo players of Chile
Water polo players at the 1948 Summer Olympics